Phragmipedium lindleyanum is a species of orchid ranging from northern South America to Brazil (Pernambuco). It is most noteworthy for the great length of its petals, up to 19.5 inches (fifty centimeters) long.

References

External links 

lindleyanum
Orchids of Brazil
Orchids of Pernambuco